The Mass of Men is a 2012 British short film directed by Gabriel Gauchet, a student of the National Film and Television School (NFTS). Peter Faulkner stars as Richard, an unemployed man who is penalised for arriving late to a job centre appointment with his advisor Kate, played by Jane McDowell.

According to Gauchet, the film was based on the experiences of friends and family who were jobseekers and suffered similar humiliation.

It has been selected by 111 film festivals and is a winner of 58 awards. The film is one of the three films from the NFTS that swept the board at the annual CILECT awards in 2013.

Plot
When Richard (Peter Faulkner), an unemployed man of 55, arrives three minutes late for an appointment at the job centre, Kate (Jane McDowell) penalises him for his tardiness. While she berates him, another man (Dominic Kinnaird), armed with a nail gun, attacks her.

Accolades
The Mass of Men has won many awards.

Locarno International Film Festival 2012 - Golden Leopard (Pardi di Domani) for Best International Short Film
San Sebastian International Film Festival 2012 - First prize at the International Film Students Meeting
Tampere Film Festival 2013 - Grand Prix
BUFVC - Student Production Postgraduate Award 2013
Royal Television Society Awards 2013 - Postgraduate Student Television Award
28th Alpinale Short Film Festival - Best International Short Film
CILECT Prize - Best Fiction 2013
Encounters Short Film and Animation Festival - NAHEMI prize
Cyprus International Short Film Festival 2013 - Best International Short
Molodist International Film Festival - Grand Prix of the Festival

References

External links

2012 short films
2012 films
Golden Leopard winners
British short films
2010s English-language films